Charles Clifford may refer to:

 Sir Charles Clifford, 1st Baronet (1813–1893), first Speaker of the New Zealand House of Representatives
 Charles Clifford (photographer) (1820–1863), Welsh photographer
 Sir Charles Clifford, 4th Baronet (1821–1895), Member of Parliament (MP) for the Isle of Wight 1857–1865, Newport 1870–1885
 Charles Clifford, pseudonym of William Henry Ireland (1775–1835) English literary forger
 Charles Clifford (locomotive engineer) (died 1927), locomotive superintendent of the Great Northern Railway of Ireland.